Hilsea Lido is a freshwater lido at Hilsea, Portsmouth, England. The lido was closed for a number of years but reopened undergoing refurbishment under the control of Hilsea Lido Pool for the People.

Description
The Hilsea Lido is a leisure facility featuring the Main Pool (measuring 67m x 18m – 4.6m deep) and a large Splash Pool (45m x 18m x 6ins deep) designed for younger swimmers. At 4.6 metres (15 feet) deep, the lido has the distinction of being the deepest outdoor pool in the UK apart from Broomhill Pool which is the same depth.

Though closed throughout 2009 and 2010 due to refurbishment work, the Main Pool is normally a venue for a number of sporting activities such as Water polo, diving championships, as well as swimming.

The Splash (paddling) Pool is surrounded by green space and located next to the children's playground, but Portsmouth City Council are proposing replacing it with a water play area (similar to the one near Blue Reef Aquarium in Southsea).

The lido is managed by a voluntary group of local residents, the HLPP Trust, under licence from Portsmouth City Council.

The site of the lido is connected to Alexandra Park via the Stamshaw Esplanade.

History
Plans for development of the lido were agreed in 1932 and the lido opened on 24 July 1935. The architect for the lido was Joseph Parkin. The pool originally used seawater, converting later to freshwater, and the lido design included two large fountains which have been retained but are no longer used. The Main Pool and changing facilities were designed for the use of 768 adults and 180 children with accommodation for around 1000 spectators. In 1936 the Lido was visited by the British diving team from 1936 Summer Olympics who gave a demonstration on 31 August During World War 2 the main pool was closed to the general public and was given over to the use of the various military units in the area. Between 1946 and 1951 a miniature railway ran along the lido site. In 1974 the Lido was used as a set for the Bernie's Holiday Camp scene in the film Tommy. Later in the 70s the lido's diving platforms were removed. In 1995 the Lido lent its name to the Vulcan Software management simulation game Hillsea Lido.

In 2006 plans for refurbishing the lido were abandoned by the council, however extended campaigning by residents continued and in 2009 a management trust had been established, now a registered charity. In 2010 Hilsea Lido Pool for the People acquired the lido and adjoining Blue Lagoon building on a 99-year lease Portsmouth City Council. The lido was open for viewing on 19 September 2009 for the Heritage Open Days.

In June 2012 Sport England gave Hilsea lido Pool for the people a £50,000 grant towards the cost of restoring the pool. The money was used to refurbish the pool's pumps and fit new lockers and showers.

In the winter of 2010/11 the splash pool was damaged by freezing conditions. In April 2011 Portsmouth City Council decided to replace the pool with a new design featuring two pools. The new design was named the Hilsea Jubilee Splash Pool and was completed in 2012 at a cost of £332,000.

The lido reopened in July 2014. In 2015 a new 2 metre diving platform was added to the lido.

References

External links

 Lido Pool for the People (HLPP) Trust
 No Diving – History of Hilsea Lido
 Lidos in the UK

Lidos
Buildings and structures completed in 1935
Buildings and structures in Portsmouth